The  Philadelphia Eagles season was the franchise's 27th season in the National Football League. They improved on their previous output of 2–9–1, winning seven games. The team failed to qualify for the playoffs for the tenth consecutive season.

Off-season 
The Eagles held training camp in Hershey, Pennsylvania.

NFL Draft 
The 1959 NFL Draft was held on December 2, 1958 (rounds 1–4) and January 21, 1959 (rounds 5–30). The draft consisted of 30 rounds with each of the 12 NFL teams having one draft pick in each round. A total of 360 players were selected in this year's draft. There was no lottery bonus pick this year as it had run its course; all 12 teams had been given a bonus pick in previous drafts.

As the Green Bay Packers had the worst record in the previous season at 1–10–1, they had the first draft pick, and selected Randy Duncan, the quarterback for the Iowa Hawkeyes. The Packers' lone win in 1958 had been over the Eagles, 38–35, on October 26 in Green Bay.

The Eagles and the Chicago Cardinals both had 2–9–1 records in 1958, which were tied for the 2nd-worst record in the league, so they rotated in picking 2nd or 3rd in each round. Despite their poor records in 1958, both of these teams had defeated the eventual Eastern Conference champion New York Giants that year. The Eagles traded their first-round pick, the 2nd overall pick in the draft, to the Los Angeles Rams for quarterback Norm Van Brocklin. The Eagles made their first draft selection in round 2 with the 15th overall pick.

In 1959 the Eagles and Packers would both improve to 7–5–0. Then in 1960 they would each win their respective conference championships and meet in the NFL Championship game.

Player selections 
The table shows the Eagles' selections and what picks they had that were traded away and the team that ended up with that pick. It is possible the Eagles' pick ended up with this team via another team that the Eagles made a trade with.
Not shown are acquired picks that the Eagles traded away.

 30th round pick Angelo Mosca had already chosen to play in the Canadian Football League for the Hamilton Tiger-Cats in the 1958 season after 3 years at Notre Dame and his senior year at Wyoming

Schedule 

 Intra-conference opponents are in bold text.

Standings

Roster 
(All time List of Philadelphia Eagles players in franchise history)

 + After name means 1st team selection

Season summary

Week 3 vs Steelers

Postseason 
Before the start of the 1960 Season, but after the 1960 NFL Draft, on March 19, the NFL had an expansion draft for the Dallas Cowboys. The Philadelphia Eagles lost, Dick Bielski a tight end, Gerry Delucca an offensive tackle, and Bil Striegel, a linebacker.

Honors and awards 
Pro Bowl selections – East Team
 Norm Van Brocklin – QB
 Billy Barnes – 	HB
 Tommy McDonald – 	Flanker
 Marion Campbell – 	DT
 Tom Brookshier – 	CB

League leaders
 Norm Van Brocklin finishes 2nd in pass attempts with 340
 Norm Van Brocklin finishes 2nd in pass completions with 191
 Norm Van Brocklin finishes 2nd in passing yards with 2617
 Norm Van Brocklin finishes 3rd in passing yards per Attempt Avg with 7.70
 Norm Van Brocklin finishes 3rd in passing touchdowns with 14
 Tommy McDonald finishes 2nd in pass receptions with 47
 Tommy McDonald finishes 3rd in pass receiving yards with 846
 Tommy McDonald finishes 2nd in pass reception touchdowns with 10
 Tommy McDonald finishes 2nd (tied with 8) in punt return for a touchdown with 1
 Tommy McDonald finishes 2nd in kickoff returns with 24
 Art Powell finishes 2nd in kickoff returns avg. 27.1

References 

Philadelphia Eagles seasons
Philadelphia Eagles
Philadelphia